Haunted School or The Haunted School may refer to:
 School Ghost Stories, a 1995 Japanese horror film also known as Haunted School
 School Ghost Stories 2, a 1996 film also known as Haunted School 2
 School Ghost Stories 3, a 1997 film also known as Haunted School 3
 The Haunted School (film), a 2007 Hong Kong horror film
 The Haunted School (TV series), an Australian television series
 Haunted Schools, a book by American non-fiction author Allan Zullo

See also
 List of reportedly haunted locations